The Super Trio Series is a Hong Kong variety show series produced by TVB. It debuted in 1995, and remained in production for eighteen years due to its popularity. The show was hosted by Eric Tsang and his two assistants - Jerry Lamb and Chin Kar-lok.

The show initially ended its run with the airing of the final episode on July 16, 2005. However, on March 9, 2008, the first episode of the show's spin-off series Super Trio Wonder Trip was aired; its main purpose was to introduce a series of new games that are to be imported from various game shows all over the world and would appear in series 8, Super Trio Supreme. On May 26, 2013, the tenth series, Super Trio Maximus, was aired, its final episode airing on January 12, 2014.

Eight years later, in 2022, the show was revived with the new series,  Super Trio Returns. Eric Tsang, Chin Ka-Lok, Louis Yuen from series 8 and Mayanne Mak from  I Heart HK hosted the program as prizemaster and prize elders respectively. Additionally, Hellston Ching and Amisha Ng joined the program as new prize elders.

Format

Each episode features several popular Hong Kong celebrities as guest stars. Sometimes contestants from Miss Hong Kong pageants and other international pageants are invited. They participate in different party games devised by the producers, usually ridiculous or sexually provocative. At the end of each round, attractive (or sometimes bizarre) prizes would be awarded to the winners. Audiences are often included as part of the show.

Series titles
Over the course of its run, the series uses different names to identify its different shows.

Series 1: Movie Buff Championship
Airdates: December 20, 1995 - July 17, 1996

Timeslots: Wednesday evenings

Hosts: Eric Tsang, Jordan Chan, Jerry Lamb, Chin Kar-lok (later in the series replacing Jordan Chan - EPS.21)

Episodes: 31

Series 2: Movie Buff Championship (Sr.2)
Airdates: May 28, 1997 - November 5, 1997

Timeslots: Wednesday evenings

Hosts: Eric Tsang, Jerry Lamb, Chin Kar-lok

Episodes: 23

One episode was a drama-type episode instead of the usual game show episode.

Series 3: The Super Trio Show
Airdates: October 17, 1998 - April 10, 1999

Timeslots: Saturday evenings

Hosts: Eric Tsang, Jerry Lamb, Chin Kar-lok

Episodes: 26

Series 4: The Super Trio Mega Show
Airdates: August 30, 1999 - October 1, 1999

Timeslots: Weekday evenings from 8:30 pm to 9:30 pm Hong Kong time

Hosts: Eric Tsang, Jerry Lamb, Chin Kar-lok, Laan-Sai (蘭茜), Cindy Au

At the time, My Fair Princess played on ATV, creating competition between the networks. Therefore, TVB decided to air the episodes on weekdays.

Episodes: 26

*WIP*

Series 5: The Super Trio Show (Sr.2)
Airdates: October 28, 2000 - February 24, 2001

Timeslots: Saturday evenings

Hosts: Eric Tsang, Jerry Lamb, Chin Kar-lok, Amen (區焯文)Bean (劉蜀永), Shum Po-yee (岑寶兒)

Episodes: 17

Series 6: A Trio Delights
Airdates: August 10, 2002 - December 7, 2002

Timeslots: Saturday evenings from 8:30 pm to 9:30 pm, with the exception of episodes 14 and 16, which played from 8:30 pm to 10:00 pm

Hosts: Eric Tsang, Jerry Lamb, Chin Kar-lok

In the last episode, the first six contestants (Alex To, Shirley Kwan, Natalis Chan, Nicola Cheung, Victor Chen and Kelly Chen) played against each other in a series of individual and sometimes team games. After that, other contestants showed up and competed against the first six contestants as teams. The others won over the original six contestants.

Series 7: The Super Trio Continues
Airdates: September 26, 2004 - July 17, 2005

Hosts: Eric Tsang, Jerry Lamb, Chin Kar-lok

Timeslots: Sunday evenings from 8:30 pm to 9:30 pm with the exceptions of:

Ep 37 was the 10th anniversary episode: 8:30 to 10:00 pm
Ep 38 was played in 2 parts:
Part 1: 8:00 pm to 9:30 pm
Part 2: 10:30 pm to 11:00 pm

Post-Series 7: The Super Trio - Total Recall
Timeslot: Saturday, July 16, 2005 from 10:30 pm to 11:00 pm

Hosts: Jerry Lamb and Chin Kar-lok

This final special featured clips from past series, and parts of the final ceremony in the 37th episode of The Super Trio Continues.

Pre-Series 8: Super Trio Wonder Trip 
Airdates: March 9, 2008 - March 23, 2008

Episodes: 3

Hosts: Eric Tsang, Louis Yuen, Chin Kar-lok and Wong Cho Lam

Featured Guests: Ella Koon, Timmy Hung, Angela Tong, Fiona Yuen, Jeanette Leung Ching Kok, Toby Leung

The series is the spin-off series before the upcoming eighth series of the Super Trio. The spin-off series follows the cancelling of the show in 2005 and the rebuilding the show (Jerry Lam left TVB for ATV), as Eric Tsang, Louis Yuen, Chin Kar-lok and Wong Cho Lam and their guests travel the world to find new games to bring back to Hong Kong for the upcoming eight series.

Series 8: Super Trio Supreme
Airdates: March 30, 2008 - March 22, 2009

Hosts: Eric Tsang, Louis Yuen, Chin Kar-lok, Wong Cho Lam

Timeslots: Sunday evenings from 8:30 pm to 9:30 pm, after changing to Sunday evenings from 9:00 pm to 10:00 pm

Originally, the broadcast length was 26 episodes but due to very strong viewership from this series, the number of episodes was increased first to 39, then to 43.

Pre-Series 9: Super Trio Game Master Pre-show 
Airdate: April 18, 2010

Episodes: 1

Hosts: Eric Tsang, Chin Kar-lok, King Kong (金剛), Elvina Kong (江欣燕), Otto Wong (王志安)

Featured Guests: Carlo Ng, Timmy Hung, Angela Tong, Toby Leung, Sammy Leung, Kitty Yuen, Eddie Pang, HotCha

Series 9: Super Trio Game Master
Airdates: April 25, 2010 - November 21, 2010

Hosts: Eric Tsang, Chin Kar-lok, King Kong (金剛), Elvina Kong, Otto of EO2

Timeslots: Sunday evenings from 9:00 pm to 10:00 pm

Series 10: Super Trio Maximus
Airdates: May 26, 2013 - January 12, 2014

Timeslots: Sunday evenings

Hosts: Eric Tsang, Jordan Chan, Jerry Lamb, Chin Ka-lok, Louis Yuen, Wong Cho-lam, King Kong (金剛), Elvina Kong, Otto of EO2, Lindsey Ellingson

Series 11: Super Trio Returns
Airdates: July 31, 2022 - November 27, 2022

Timeslots: Sunday evenings from 8:30-9:30 PM

Hosts: Eric Tsang, Louis Yuen, Mayenne Mak, Chin Ka-lok, Louis Yuen, Amisha Ng, Hellston Ching, Wong Cho-lam (Special guest host), Nancy Lan Sai (Guest host (Prize Master Representative))

*- indicates that they are a prize elder, but played as a guest due to the lack of players on one team

Note: Episode 6 was umbrellaed under the special "THE SHOW MUST GO ON" timeslot, due to the rescheduling of the Miss Hong Kong Pageant and also the fact that Tsang was noticeably absent for this episode.

International versions
This is the list of international versions of Super Trio:

References 

TVB original programming
Hong Kong game shows
1995 Hong Kong television series debuts
2014 Hong Kong television series endings
1990s game shows
1990s Hong Kong television series
2000s game shows
2000s Hong Kong television series
2010s game shows
2010s Hong Kong television series